Tom Ruegger is an American animator and songwriter. Ruegger is known for his association with Disney Television Animation and Warner Bros. Animation. He also created Tiny Toon Adventures, Animaniacs, Pinky and the Brain, and Histeria!.

Early life and career
Ruegger was raised in Metuchen, New Jersey. During his childhood, he made drawings of The Flintstones when it aired. He graduated from Metuchen High School in 1972.

In 1976, he made his first cartoon, called The Premiere of Platypus Duck, while he was a student at Dartmouth College. Shortly after graduation from Dartmouth that year, he moved to Los Angeles to become an animator. Ruegger began his career at Filmation, writing for Gilligan's Planet. He soon after joined Hanna-Barbera, writing and producing various animated series, most notably The New Scooby-Doo Mysteries, Snorks, The 13 Ghosts of Scooby-Doo, Pound Puppies, and A Pup Named Scooby-Doo. He also wrote one episode of He-Man and the Masters of the Universe.

In 1989, he began working alongside Jean MacCurdy and Steven Spielberg at Warner Bros. Animation to create and produce several animated series, including Tiny Toon Adventures, Taz-Mania, Batman: The Animated Series, The Plucky Duck Show, Animaniacs, Pinky and the Brain, Freakazoid, Road Rovers, and Histeria.

In 2004, Ruegger started Tom Ruegger Production, a full-service animation studio. In 2006, Ruegger began developing, story-editing and serving as executive producer on the 40-episode animated series Animalia, based on the picture book by Graeme Base. Along with Nicholas Hollander, he developed and story-edited another animated series entitled Sushi Pack.

In 2011, Ruegger began working for Disney Television Animation, where he executive produced 40 half-hours of The 7D for Disney XD, a comedy based on the seven Dwarfs from Snow White and the Seven Dwarfs.

Ruegger has received fourteen Emmy Awards for his work in animation.

Personal life
Ruegger married voice actress Adrienne Alexander in 1983; they have three sons together, Nathan, Luke and Cody. The couple divorced in 2004. In 2006, he married marathon runner Annie Malley, and they reside near Los Angeles, California. Nathan and Luke have become voice actors. Nathan voiced the baby version of Plucky Duck on Tiny Toon Adventures, Skippy Squirrel on Animaniacs and Froggo on Histeria, where Luke provided the voice for the Flame and Bumpo Basset on Animaniacs and Big Fat Baby on Histeria. Cody performed the voice of Little Blue Bird on Animaniacs and Loud Kiddington on Histeria. Ruegger's sons also are the primary inspiration behind the main characters in Animaniacs, Yakko, Wakko and Dot.

As of 2017, Cody is serving as an attorney in New York City, while Nathan and Luke have careers in film and television in Los Angeles.

Ruegger himself also made occasional cameos on his shows in caricature form, most notably as the recurring character of director Cooper DeVille in Tiny Toon Adventures.

Filmography

Film

Television

References

External links
 
 Official blog

1950s births
20th-century American artists
20th-century American male writers
21st-century American artists
21st-century American writers
American male screenwriters
American male television writers
American lyricists
American parodists
American producers
American storyboard artists
American television writers
Animators from California
Animators from New Jersey
Dartmouth College alumni
Daytime Emmy Award winners
Filmation people
Hanna-Barbera people
Living people
Metuchen High School alumni
People from Metuchen, New Jersey
Primetime Emmy Award winners
Screenwriters from California
Screenwriters from New Jersey
Songwriters from California
Songwriters from New Jersey
Warner Bros. Animation people
Writers from Los Angeles
Year of birth missing (living people)